Bissaya Barreto Aerodrome, is a recreational airfield in Antanhol, near Coimbra.

Overview
Even though most of the airfield's land is located in Antanhol, some believe The Aeródromo Municipal Bissaya Barreto is located in Cernache, but it's not legally true.

It is managed by the Câmara Municipal de Coimbra and is home to several entities like the Aeroclube de Coimbra, I.A.C. - Indústrias Aeronáuticas de Coimbra and Publivoo. The Aero Clube da Figueira da Foz also has its operational base at this airfield.

Access
The only road leading to this airfield passes through Antanhol.

See also
Transport in Portugal
List of airports in Portugal

References

External links
Aeródromo Municipal Bissaya Barreto no Pelicano

Airports in Portugal
Buildings and structures in Coimbra